Øvre Tysdalsvatnet is a lake in the municipality of Hjelmeland in Rogaland county, Norway. The  lake lies on the east side of the village of Årdal.

See also
List of lakes in Norway

References

Hjelmeland
Lakes of Rogaland